"This One's for You" is a song by French DJ and music producer David Guetta, featuring vocals from Swedish singer Zara Larsson. It is the official song of the UEFA Euro 2016 held in France. The track was also recorded with the help of one million fans around the world through the help of a special online app. American singer Ariana Grande also recorded a demo for the song. The song is included as a bonus track on Japanese versions of Zara Larsson's second studio album So Good (2017).

Track listing

Music video
The video of the song was released on June 10, 2016, on YouTube. The song's music video was presented by Turkish Airlines.

Live performances
Guetta and Larsson performed the single during the opening and closing ceremonies of the competition – in Guetta's native country, France – in addition to putting on a free concert in Paris on the Champ de Mars, underneath the Eiffel Tower, on 9 June 2016.

Credits and personnel
David Guetta – producer, instruments
Zara Larsson – featuring artist, lead vocals
Giorgio Tuinfort – producer, instruments, piano
Afrojack – producer, instruments
Ester Dean – songwriter
Daddy's Groove – programming, mixer, master engineer
Emanuel Abrahamsson – vocal producer, recording engineer
Thomas Troelsen – assistant producer
Elio Debets – backing vocals, vocal recording engineer
Rob Bekhuis, Eelco Bakker, Earl St. Clair, James Bloniarz, Quinn Garrett, Sean Bacastow and One Million Voices of Fans around the World – background vocals

Charts

Weekly charts

Year-end charts

Certifications

Release history

References

2016 singles
2016 songs
David Guetta songs
Zara Larsson songs
Parlophone singles
Songs written by Ester Dean
Songs written by Giorgio Tuinfort
Songs written by Afrojack
Songs written by Thomas Troelsen
Music videos directed by Hannah Lux Davis
SNEP Top Singles number-one singles
Number-one singles in Germany
Number-one singles in Portugal
Number-one singles in Switzerland
Football songs and chants
UEFA Euro 2016
UEFA European Championship official songs and anthems
Moombahton songs
Songs written by David Guetta
Song recordings produced by David Guetta